William Herbert Burns (February 27, 1878 - January 1, 1964) was a Canadian politician and merchant. He was elected to the House of Commons of Canada as a Member of the Conservative Party of Canada in the 1930 election to represent the riding of Portage la Prairie. He was defeated in the 1935 election.

Born in Stayner, Ontario, Burns was elected councillor of Portage la Prairie, Manitoba and became mayor in 1921 until 1930.

Burns was named to the team that represented the Manitoba Curling Association at the 1932 Winter Olympics. That year, curling was a demonstration sport. Burns was skip for the team which took first place in the event. The Manitoba team was undefeated, winning all four of its games at the Olympics. In 2004, the team was inducted into the Manitoba Sports Hall of Fame.

References

External links
 

1878 births
1964 deaths
Conservative Party of Canada (1867–1942) MPs
Members of the House of Commons of Canada from Manitoba
Canadian sportsperson-politicians
Canadian male curlers
Curlers from Manitoba
Olympic curlers of Canada
Olympic gold medalists for Canada
Curlers at the 1932 Winter Olympics
Medalists at the 1932 Winter Olympics
People from Clearview, Ontario